The Notre Dame Fighting Irish football statistical leaders are individual statistical leaders of the Notre Dame Fighting Irish football program in various categories, including passing, rushing, receiving, total offense, defensive stats, kicking, and scoring. Within those areas, the lists identify single-game, single-season, and career leaders. The Fighting Irish represent the University of Notre Dame as an independent in the NCAA Division I Football Bowl Subdivision (FBS).

Although Notre Dame began competing in intercollegiate football in 1887, records from the early years are often incomplete and inconsistent and may not appear on this list. Notre Dame's official record book does not list a specific "modern era" beginning in a certain year, and the records listed below can go as far back as 1900, although they may not be complete.

These lists are dominated by more recent players for several reasons:
 Since the 1940s, seasons have increased from 10 games to 11 and then 12 games in length.
 The NCAA didn't allow freshmen to play varsity football until 1972 (with the exception of the World War II years), allowing players to have four-year careers.
 Bowl games only began counting toward single-season and career statistics in 2002. The Fighting Irish have played in 13 bowl games since then, allowing more recent players an extra game to accumulate statistics.

These lists are updated through Notre Dame's game against North Carolina on November 27, 2020.

Passing

Passing yards

Passing touchdowns

Rushing

Rushing yards

Rushing touchdowns

Receiving

Receptions

Receiving yards

Receiving touchdowns

Total offense
Total offense is the sum of passing and rushing statistics. It does not include receiving or returns.

Total offense yards

Touchdowns responsible for
"Touchdowns responsible for" is the official NCAA term for combined passing and rushing touchdowns.

Defense

Interceptions

Tackles

Sacks

Kicking

Field goals made

Field goal percentage

Scoring

Points

Touchdowns
These lists reflect touchdowns scored. Accordingly, they include rushing, receiving, and return touchdowns, but not passing touchdowns.

References

Notre Dame